Shomera (lit. Guard) is a moshav in northern Israel. Located near the Lebanese border, it falls under the jurisdiction of Ma'ale Yosef Regional Council.

History
The moshav was established in 1949 by Jewish immigrants from Hungary and Romania on the site of the Shia village of Tarbikha. Its land had belonged to the  Palestinian villages of Iqrit, Suruh and Tarbikha, all of which were depopulated in the 1948 Arab–Israeli War. The name reflects the moshav's proximity to the Lebanese border.

The original residents abandoned the village shortly after its foundation, but the following year it was re-established by Jewish immigrants from Morocco.

An Israel Defense Forces armory is located in the moshav.

Gallery

References

Moshavim
Populated places established in 1949
Populated places in Northern District (Israel)
1949 establishments in Israel
Hungarian-Jewish culture in Israel
Romanian-Jewish culture in Israel